The John Eales Medal is awarded to honour the best Australian rugby union player each year. The medal, which was launched in 2002, is jointly awarded each year by the Australian Rugby Union and the Rugby Union Players Association.

The medal is named after John Eales, arguably the most successful captain in the history of Australian Rugby.

Voting for the John Eales Medal is tallied after each Test match, with each Wallabies player awarding points on a 3–2–1 basis.

RUPA Chief Executive Tony Dempsey is quoted as saying:
This is the ultimate award. To be voted the best in your country by your own peers is the highest honour a player can hope to aspire to. Naming this award after Australia's most successful captain ever is fully endorsed by the Players. This has become one of the most sought after and coveted awards in Australian sport.

The winner of the 2021 medal, Michael Hooper, was honoured for a record fourth time.

List of winners

See also

References

External links
 RUPA.com.au

Rugby union trophies and awards
Australian sports trophies and awards
Awards established in 2002
Rugby union players in Australia
2002 establishments in Australia
Sportsmanship trophies and awards